Nathan Cooper may refer to:

 Nathan Cooper (Canadian politician) (born 1980), member of the Legislative Assembly of Alberta
 Nathan Cooper (Missouri politician), member of the Missouri House of Representatives
 Nathan A. Cooper (1802–1879), U.S. Army general from New Jersey